Chookaki Paeen is a village in Tamin Rural District, in the Corrin of Zahedan County, Sistan and Baluchestan Province, Iran. At the 2006 census, its population was 94, in 15 families.

References 

Populated places in Zahedan County